Sanjay Rajaram Raut (Marathi pronunciation: [sənd͡ʒəj ɾaːut̪]; born 15 November 1961) is an Indian politician from Shiv Sena (Uddhav Balasaheb Thackeray) party. He  is a member of the Parliament of India representing Maharashtra in the Rajya Sabha, the upper house of the Indian Parliament. He is the Executive Editor of Marathi newspaper Saamana, published by Uddhav Thackeray, the Shiv Sena party leader.

Sanjay Raut is also the writer of Thackeray, a biopic about Bal Thackeray, the founder of Shiv Sena, released in 2019.

Controversies
After the arrest of the two girls who posted and liked a comment on Facebook about their view of Mumbai shutting down after the death of Bala Saheb Thackeray, he justified saying "We support the police's action, the Facebook comments could have led to a law and order situation."

In April 2015, he made controversy by saying the voting rights of Muslims should be revoked for some years to ensure the community is not used for vote bank politics. In the newspaper Saamna, he wrote in a column, "Till Muslims are used as vote-banks, they have no future. This is why Bal Thackeray had demanded that Muslims' voting rights be taken away." Raut was taken into custody and detained by the ED in the Patravala Chaal scam case. Sanjay Raut allegedly perceived funds from Pravin Raut, the main accused of the Rs. 60,000 crores scam. The later is said to have gained access to high levels in the government due to his close relationship with Sanjay Raut, who is a relative, close aide, and also business partner. 

In 2022, in the middle of the political turmoil in Maharashtra, Raut was served notice by the Enforcement Directorate (ED) for interrogation.

Member of Rajya Sabha
 Member of Rajya Sabha (2004-2010) and Leader of Shiv Sena in Rajya Sabha. (2004-2009)
Parliamentary Committee assignments 
Member of Committee on Home Affairs Member
Consultative Committee for the Ministry of Civil Aviation (2005-2009)

Member of Rajya Sabha (Second term) (2010-2016)
Parliamentary Committee assignments 
Member of Committee on Food, Consumer Affairs and Public Distribution Member
Member Consultative Committee for the Ministry of Power (2010)
 Member of Rajya Sabha (Third term) (2016-2022)
Parliamentary Committee assignments 
 13 Sept. 2021 onwards: Member, Consultative Committee, Committee on External Affairs
 Member of Rajya Sabha (fourth term) (2022–present) representing Shiv Sena (Uddhav Balasaheb Thackeray) after Shiv Sena split in June 2022.

See also

 Rajya Sabha Members

References

External links
 
 Profile on Rajya Sabha website

Marathi politicians
Shiv Sena politicians
Indian Hindus
Living people
1961 births
Rajya Sabha members from Maharashtra
People from Alibag